Grabie (Polish for "Rake") is a Polish coat of arms.  It was used by many szlachta (noble) families in the Kingdom of Poland and under the Polish–Lithuanian Commonwealth, including the Grabias.

History

Blazon

Notable bearers
Notable bearers of this coat of arms have included:
 House of Szczuka
 Stanisław Antoni Szczuka
 House of Lipski
(( House of Kroczewski))

Gallery

Bibliography
Tadeusz Gajl, Herby szlacheckie Rzeczypospolitej Obojga Narodów, Gdańsk, 2003 
Andrzej Brzezina Winiarski, Herby szlachty Rzeczypospolitej, Warszawa 2006
Kasper Niesiecki, Herbarz Polski, 1839–1846
Bartosz Paprocki, Gniazdo Cnoty, 1578, fol. 1079. O herb fol. 562. Okol. tom. 1. fol. 229. Biel. fol. 207.
Bartosz Paprocki, Herby Rycerstwa Polskiego, 1584
Adam Boniecki, Herbarz Polski, wyd.II dr Marek Jerzy Minakowski, Kraków 2005
Piotr Nałęcz Małachowski, Zbiór Nazwisk Szlachty, Lublin 1805
Juliusz hr. Ostrowski, Księga Herbowa Rodów Polskich, Warszawa 1897

See also
 Polish heraldry
 Heraldic family
 List of Polish nobility coats of arms

Polish coats of arms